The foreign relations of North Macedonia since its independence in 1991 have been characterized by the country's efforts to gain membership in international organizations such as NATO and the European Union and to gain international recognition under its constitutional name, overshadowed by a long-standing, dead-locked dispute with neighboring Greece. Greek objections to the country's name have led to it being admitted to the United Nations and several other international fora only under the provisional designation Former Yugoslav Republic of Macedonia.

Diplomatic relations

North Macedonia became a member state of the United Nations on April 8, 1993, eighteen months after its independence from the former Socialist Federal Republic of Yugoslavia. It was referred within the UN as "the former Yugoslav Republic of Macedonia", pending a resolution, to the long-running dispute about the country's name. Unusually, the country's flag was not raised at UN Headquarters when the state joined the UN. It was not until after the country's flag was changed that it was raised at the UN Headquarters. Other international bodies, such as the European Union, European Broadcasting Union, and the International Olympic Committee had adopted the same naming convention. NATO also used that name in official documents but added an explanation on which member countries recognise the constitutional name. A number of countries recognised the country by its former constitutional name – the Republic of Macedonia – rather than the UN reference, notably four of the five permanent UN Security Council members (the United Kingdom, the United States, China, and Russia). All UN member states currently recognise North Macedonia as a sovereign state.

List of countries

Bilateral relations

Africa

Americas

Asia

Europe

Oceania

Issues

Flag issue

North Macedonia's first post-independence flag caused a major controversy when it was unveiled. The use of the Vergina Sun on the flag was seen by Greece as territorial claim to the northern Greek region of Macedonia, where the golden larnax containing the symbol was unearthed in 1977 during excavations in Vergina by Greek archaeologist Manolis Andronikos. 

The Vergina Sun, claimed by Greece as an exclusive state symbol, was removed from the flag under an agreement reached between the Republic of North Macedonia and Greece in September 1995. The Republic agreed to meet a number of Greek demands for changes to its national symbols and constitution, while Greece agreed to establish diplomatic relations with the Republic and end its economic blockade.

Under the Prespa Agreement, North Macedonia recognised (among other Ancient Macedonian elements) the Vergina Sun as a Hellenic symbol and agreed to remove the Vergina Sun from public display in all State-owned organisations, products, logos, etc. The implementation of this clause started on August 12, 2019. Within six months following the entry into force of this Agreement, the Second Party [i.e. North Macedonia] shall review the status of monuments, public buildings and infrastructures on its territory, and insofar as they refer in any way to ancient Hellenic history and civilization constituting an integral component of the historic or cultural patrimony of the First Party, shall take appropriate corrective action to effectively address the issue and ensure respect for the said patrimony.—Article 8, paragraph 2 of the Prespa agreement

The Second Party [i.e. North Macedonia] shall not use again in any way and in all its forms the symbol formerly displayed on its former national flag [i.e. the Vergina Sun]. Within six months of the entry into force of this Agreement, the Second Party shall proceed to the removal of the symbol displayed on its former national flag from all public sites and public usages on its territory. Archaeological artefacts do not fall within the scope of this provision.—Article 8, paragraph 3 of the Prespa agreement

Constitutional issue
North Macedonia's first post-independence constitution, adopted on November 17, 1991 included a number of clauses that Greece interpreted as promoting secessionist sentiment among the Slavophone population of northern Greece, and making irredentist claims on Greek territory. Article 49 of the constitution caused particular concern. It read:

(1) The Republic cares for the status and rights of those persons belonging to the Macedonian people in neighboring countries, as well as Macedonian expatriates, assists their cultural development and promotes links with them. In the exercise of this concern the Republic will not interfere in the sovereign rights of other states or in their internal affairs.
(2) The Republic cares for the cultural, economic and social rights of the citizens of the Republic abroad.

The Greek government interpreted this as a licence for North Macedonia to interfere in Greek internal affairs. Given long-standing Greek sensitivities over the position of the country's minority groups, the government saw this as being the most serious of the three main issues affecting relations between the two countries; the issue of the republic's symbols, by contrast, was seen as being of much less substantive importance, even though it aroused the loudest political controversy. The Greek prime minister at the time, Constantine Mitsotakis, later commented that

What concerned me from the very first moment was not the name of the state. The problem for me was that [we should not allow] the creation of a second minority problem in the area of western [Greek] Macedonia [the first minority being the Turkish-speaking Greeks of western Thrace]. My main aim was to convince the Republic to declare that there is no Slavomacedonian minority in Greece. This was the real key of our difference with Skopje.

The offending articles were removed under the 1995 agreement between the two sides.

See also

 List of diplomatic missions in North Macedonia
 List of diplomatic missions of North Macedonia
 List of state visits made by Gjorge Ivanov
 Passport of North Macedonia
 Foreign relations of Yugoslavia

References

External links

 Ministry of Foreign Affairs of the Republic of North Macedonia